Mike Loades  is a British writer, television presenter, director, and military historian.

Career
As a television presenter/host he is best known for the BBC series' Time Commanders (2003-2005) and Weapons That Made Britain (2004) for Channel 4, Medieval Tournament: Making of a Knight (2003) for Channel 4 and Discovery Channel, Weapon Masters (2007) for Discovery Networks, and Going Medieval (2012) for H2.  Loades appears regularly in television history documentaries as a military historian/historical weapons specialist.
He also works as a director for television  and as a historical consultant for the video games industry. Additionally he works as a fight choreographer/action arranger, who specializes in historical combat.

Loades has had several books published on arms and armour topics in addition to one about the history of dogs.  He provided commentary about the Battle of the Teutoburg Forest in a short documentary for the videogame Total War: Rome 2 in addition to directing other short documentaries for the franchise - The Throwing War and Legionary Kit.. While referring to Assassin's Creed, which he had worked as a consultant to Black Flag, he said that he was "blown away" by the work that was put in by the video game industry to make their work more historically authentic.

For Ages of Empire IV, he wrote and directed nineteen short films that were embedded in the game as mini-documentaries titled Hands-On-History

Filmography
Loades has directed on related history in several television drama/documentary specials, including:
How the Silk Road Made the World (2019, NHNZ)
USS Constellation - Battling For Freedom, Indigo Films for History Channel 2007  
The Hunt For Lincoln's Assassin, Indigo Films for National Geographic channel 2006   
The Plot to Kill Jesse James, Indigo Films for History Channel 2006   
The Plot to Kill Reagan, Indigo Films for History Channel 2005  
 Weapons That Made Britain 2004
 Timeline ‘’The Peasants’ Revolt’’ with Tony Richardson
 Meet the Ancestors Se4 Ep1 ‘’The killing field’’ 2001
Archery - Its History and Forms, Running Wolf Productions 1995  (video) 
Blow by Blow Guide to Swordfighting, Running Wolf Productions 1991 (video)

Bibliography

 Swords and Swordsmen 2010 Pen and Sword Books 
 The Longbow 17 September 2013 Osprey Publishing 
 The Composite Bow 2016 Osprey Publishing
 The Crossbow 2017 Osprey Publishing 
 War Bows 2019 Osprey Publishing 
 DOGS: Working Origins and Traditional Tasks 2020, White Owl Books

References

External links
 Mike Loades Television Director

Going Medieval at history.co.uk

British military writers
British television directors
English television presenters
Living people
British historians
Year of birth missing (living people)